Johannes Hermanus Roy Stroeve (born 15 May 1977, in Emmen) is a former professional footballer. He previously played for FC Emmen, Sparta Rotterdam, Heracles Almelo, ADO Den Haag and HHC Hardenberg.

References

  VI Profile

1977 births
Living people
Dutch footballers
Association football forwards
Eredivisie players
Eerste Divisie players
Heracles Almelo players
Sparta Rotterdam players
ADO Den Haag players
FC Emmen players
HHC Hardenberg players
Footballers from Emmen, Netherlands